John Perry (1743 – 7 November 1810) was the founder of the Blackwall Yard, where he built ships largely for the East India Company.

He was buried at St Matthias Old Church, Poplar.

Ephraim Seehl, an apothecary and chemist, was married to his sister Sarah.

In 1796 his wife, Elizabeth, died, and less than a month later his second daughter, Sarah, married George Green, whom Perry had taken as apprentice a dozen years previously. In 1798 Perry married Green's sister Mary. He retired to Moor Hall, near Harlow and was appointed High Sheriff of Essex.

Perry's children by his two marriages included:
John and Philip, who followed him into the family business
Charles, first bishop of Melbourne, Australia
Thomas, father of John Perry-Watlington, MP for South Essex
Amelia (died 1874), managing committee for George Green's School

References

1743 births
1810 deaths
English shipbuilders
High Sheriffs of Essex